Temple of Diana may refer to:

Temple of Diana (Rome) in ancient Rome
Temple of Diana (Nemi) in ancient Rome, on the shore of Lake Nemi
Temple of Diana (Nîmes) in Nîmes, France
Temple of Diana (Mérida) in Mérida, Spain
Roman Temple of Évora in Portugal, sometimes referred to as Templo de Diana in Portuguese
an organization of Dianic Wicca
a supposed original religious building on the site now occupied by St Paul's Cathedral, London

People
Diana Marmion Temple (1925-2006) Australian pharmacologist

See also 
 Temple of Artemis (disambiguation)